Hajj Yusef or Haj Yusef or Hajj Yusof may refer to:
 Haj Yusef-e Olya, East Azerbaijan Province
 Haj Yusef-e Sofla, East Azerbaijan Province
 Hajj Yusef, Markazi